The University of Maribor is Slovenia's second-largest university, established in 1975 in Maribor, Slovenia. It currently has 17 faculties.

History
The university's roots reach back to 1859, when a theological seminary was established with the encouragement of Maribor bishop and patriot Anton Martin Slomšek. More faculties were established during the late 1950s and early 1960s; the faculties of economics, business, and technology in 1959, agronomy and law in 1960, and pedagogy in 1961. The university's opening ceremony occurred on 19 September 1975. 1970s was a decade of exponential rise in number of higher education institutions in the former Yugoslavia when alongside Maribor universities in Osijek, Rijeka, Split, Mostar, Podgorica, Bitola, Banja Luka, Kragujevac and Tuzla all opened their doors.

Rectors of the University of Maribor were Dali Džonlagić, Alojz Križman, Ludvik Toplak, Ivan Rozman and Igor Tičar. In late 2017 and early 2018, Jan Žan Oplotnik was acting rector for almost one year. In 2018 Zdravko Kačič was elected rector.

Reputation
The university has entered the top 1% of institutions in physics and, of the nine institutions entering the top 1% in this field, the University of Maribor did so with the highest number of citations, according to an analysis of data from Essential Science Indicators from Thomson Reuters.

The University of Maribor has cooperated in European Framework Programmes since 1998 and the number of international research projects is increasing each year. According to "Ranking Web of World Universities", the University of Maribor is in the top 15 of "Top Central and Eastern Europe Universities". It currently (2010) holds 534th position (of 12,000) of the world universities ranking, which ranks it among the top 5% of universities in the world.

Organization
The university is divided into 17 faculties:

 Faculty of Agriculture and Life Sciences
 Faculty of Arts
 Faculty of Chemistry and Chemical Engineering
 Faculty of Civil Engineering, Transportation Engineering and Architecture
 Faculty of Criminal Justice and Security (in Ljubljana) 
 Faculty of Electrical Engineering and Computer Science
 Faculty of Economics and Business
 Faculty of Education
 Faculty of Energy Technology
 Faculty of Law
 Faculty of Mechanical Engineering
 Faculty of Medicine
 Faculty of Health Sciences
 Faculty of Organizational Sciences (in Kranj)
 Faculty of Logistics (in Krško and Celje) 
 Faculty of Natural Sciences and Mathematics
 Faculty of Tourism (in Brežice)

The university also comprises several associated facilities, including the Maribor University Library, students' dormitories, the Computing Center, the Leon Štukelj Sporting Center, and Postgraduate and Visiting Faculty Home.

Distinguished faculty
Matjaž Perc, physics
Oto Luthar, history
Mylan Engel, philosophy
Darijan Božič, music
Zinka Zorko, linguistics
Majda Pajnkihar, nursing

Notable alumni
Brigita Brezovac, IFBB professional bodybuilder
Darko Horvat, politician, Minister of Economy of Croatia
Feri Horvat, politician
Drago Jančar, author
Blaž Medvešek, swimming champion
Ljudmila Novak, politician
Mária Pozsonec, politician
Jurij Toplak, lawyer and elections expert

See also

 List of colleges and universities
 Maribor
 University of Ljubljana
 University of Primorska
 University of Nova Gorica

References

External links

University of Maribor Website 

 
Educational institutions in Maribor
Universities in Slovenia
Educational institutions established in 1975
Maribor
Law schools in Slovenia